Pantano High School is an alternative high school in the Vail Unified School District. It serves students who are four or more credits behind and are at risk of failing or dropping out. Pantano is located at 13010 S. Houghton Road in Tucson, Arizona

References

Public high schools in Arizona
Schools in Tucson, Arizona